Sardar Patel Road is an arterial road in Chennai which runs from Mount Road eastwards through Guindy and Adyar for  up to the sea coast where it turns north and crosses the Adyar River to Raja Annamalaipuram.

The road begins from Ashok Leyland corporate office on the junction between Guindy Railway Station and Little Mount Junction, just near Alexander Square. The Raj Bhavan (residence of Governor of Tamil Nadu) is located on this road. Important educational institutions like IIT Madras and Anna University are also located on this road. Guindy National Park, Guindy Snake Park, Gandhi Mandapam, Cancer Institute, CLRI (Central Leather Research Institute), Madhya Kailash Temple are important landmarks on this road. A right turn from Madhya Kailash Junction takes you to Rajiv Gandhi Salai(IT Expressway) which has now been christened Rajiv Gandhi Salai. Kasturibai Nagar Railway Station on the Beach - Velachery MRTS Line is located at the junction of S.P. Road and Old Mahabalipuram Road.

In 2014, the Corporation started widening the road, which is currently 24 metres, to 30.5 metres.

See also

 Transport in Chennai

References

Roads in Chennai